Eschweilera coriacea (Portuguese: matamatá) is a species of tree in the family Lecythidaceae. It is native to Honduras, Panama and South America.

References

coriacea
Trees of Peru
Trees of Suriname
Trees of Brazil
Trees of French Guiana
Trees of Colombia
Trees of Ecuador
Trees of Guyana
Trees of Bolivia
Trees of Honduras
Trees of Panama
Trees of Venezuela